Bairagi Dwibedy is an Indian politician. He was a Member of Parliament, representing Odisha in the Rajya Sabha the upper house of India's Parliament as a member of the Swatantra Party.

References

Rajya Sabha members from Odisha
Swatantra Party politicians
Living people
Year of birth missing (living people)